Karl-Heinz Freiberger (7 March 1941 – 1 June 1992) was a German field hockey player. He competed at the 1964 Summer Olympics and the 1968 Summer Olympics.

References

External links
 

1941 births
1992 deaths
German male field hockey players
Olympic field hockey players of the United Team of Germany
Olympic field hockey players of East Germany
Field hockey players at the 1964 Summer Olympics
Field hockey players at the 1968 Summer Olympics
People from Meerane
Sportspeople from Saxony